The SPL Tamperen piiri (Tampere Football Association) is one of the 12 district organisations of the Football Association of Finland. It administers lower tier football in Tampere.

Background 

Suomen Palloliitto Tampereen piiri, commonly referred to as SPL Tamperen piiri or SPL Tampere, is the governing body for football in Tampere.  Based in the city of Tampere, the Association's Director is Timo Korsumäki.

Member clubs

League Competitions 

SPL Tamperen piiri run the following league competitions:

Men's Football
 Division 3 - Kolmonen  -  one section
 Division 4 - Nelonen  -  one section
 Division 5 - Vitonen  -  two sections
 Division 6 - Kutonen  -  five sections

Ladies Football
 Division 3 - Kolmonen  -  one section

Footnotes

References

External links 
 SPL Tamperen piiri Official Website 

T